The Battle of West Hubei, was one of 22 major engagements between the National Revolutionary Army and Imperial Japanese Army during the Second Sino-Japanese War. It was also one of four major battles that took place in Hubei.

It resulted in a Chinese strategic victory, although they lost more troops than the Japanese Army. Historian Barbara W. Tuchman, however, writes that the "Japanese withdrew without pursuit from what appeared to have been a training and foraging offensive to collect rice and river shipping." However, that states that it ended in a tactical draw.

The Chinese government and Western media reported that the Chinese had scored a major victory.

Combat
The Japanese first attacked with 40,000 troops in the 2 armies of the 26th Group Army with about 50,000 troops in 3 divisions, then attacked the 2 armies of the 10th Army with about 60,000 men, and finally attacked the upper reaches of the Yangtze River with 70,000 troops. The two armies of the Jiang Fang Army transported the ships they had already captured along the river to Hankou .

The 13th Division of the Japanese Army had more than 20,000 troops . On the night of May 12, the IJA smuggled their forces across the Yangtze River from Shashi and other places in the gap between the Jiangnan defenders, and attacked the 87th Army garrisoned from the northwest on the next morning. At the same time, IJA forces occupied Anhui. The Japanese 3rd Division and other divisions in the rural area also marched westward to the southeast to attack the 87th Army. The two Japanese troops formed a pincer offensive. As of the 28th, the Japanese troops who had crossed the Qingjiang River had approached the No. 1 national army guarding Shipai Fortress, near the road defense line - Nanlinpo position. Chen Cheng of the National Army decided to fight the enemy on the Qingjiang River and on the front line of Shipai Fortress. The decisive battle date was scheduled to be between 31st and June 1. On the other hand, after the main force of the 13th Division of the Japanese Army crossed the Qingjiang River, it was blocked by the 121st Division of the National Army and had to venture over Tianzhu Mountain in the middle of Changyang. The horses lost a lot of weight on the way. The 5th Division of the National Army set up an ambush on the Tianzhushan main road and retreated after killing hundreds of Japanese troops. On May 30, after suffering heavy casualties, the 13th Division broke through the strategically important Muqiao Creek near Shipai and attacked Taishi Bridge. The main force of the 5th Division of the National Army used the dangerous terrain of Taishi Bridge to set up an ambush. When the Japanese army entered the ambush circle, the National Army fired violently at the Japanese army with intensive firepower, and then engaged in hand-to-hand combat. The national army repelled more than 10 consecutive Japanese attacks by virtue of its difficult terrain. The main force of the 13th Division of the Japanese Army was blocked in the area of Taishiqiao and Muqiaoxi, laying the foundation for the subsequent siege of Shipai.

Results
The Chinese government and Western media reported that the Chinese had scored a major victory.  Historian Barbara W. Tuchman had another opinion, however. She wrote that the "Japanese withdrew without pursuit from what appeared to have been a training and foraging offensive to collect rice and river shipping."

Changjiao massacre

During the period of the Battle of West Hubei, Japanese troops reportedly slaughtered more than 30,000 civilians at a factory in the tiny hamlet of Changjiao, northern Hunan, over a three-day period from 9–12 May 1943.

References

West Hubei
West Hubei
1943 in China
1943 in Japan
Military history of Hubei
May 1943 events
June 1943 events